In category theory, an abstract branch of mathematics, and in its applications to logic and theoretical computer science, a list object is an abstract definition of a list, that is, a finite ordered sequence.

Formal definition 

Let C be a category with finite products and a terminal object 1. 
A list object over an object  of C is:
 an object ,
 a morphism  : 1 → , and 
 a morphism  :  ×  → 

Equivalent definitions 

In a category with a terminal object 1, binary coproducts (denoted by +), and binary products (denoted by ×), a list object over  can be defined as the initial algebra of the endofunctor that acts on objects by  ↦ 1 + ( × ) and on arrows by  ↦ [id1,〈id, 〉].

Examples 

In this case,  picks out the empty list and  corresponds to appending an element to the head of the list.
The recursion principle for lists guarantees they have the expected universal property.

Properties 

Like all constructions defined by a universal property, lists over an object are unique up to canonical isomorphism.

The object 1 (lists over the terminal object) has the universal property of a natural number object. In any category with lists, one can define the length of a list  to be the unique morphism  :  → 1 which makes the following diagram commute:

References

See also 
 Natural number object
 F-algebra
 Initial algebra

Objects (category theory)
Topos theory